The Rijkswerf (Dutch: State shipyard) in Amsterdam was a Dutch shipyard that build a significant amount of warships for the Royal Netherlands Navy.

Predecessors of the Rijkswerf

Shipyard of the Amsterdam Admiralty

In the time of the Dutch republic naval affairs were handled by 5 local admiralties. The Admiralty of Amsterdam was the most important of these. The First Anglo-Dutch War proved the need for a professional navy. On 12 August 1655, the admiralty therefore got the entire western strip of Kattenburg island for the construction of an arsenal and ship yard. The arsenal was quickly constructed on the southern extremity of Kattenburg island in 1656. It was called 's Lands Zeemagazijn and now houses the National Maritime Museum. 

The rest of Kattenburg island stretches north along the Kattenburgerstraat. On the west side of this street the former yard is still enclosed by a very long seventeenth century building and a long old wall that reaches almost to the north end of Kattenburg Island. The slipways of the yard were immediately on the other (west) side of this enclosure. 

From the arsenal and the north end of Kattenburg, dams reached to the west, and enclosed an almost square stretch of water called 's lands Dok. In this dock the ships of the admiralty could lay In ordinary. This was the usual condition for warships in the time of the Dutch republic. Upper parts of the mast, most of the rigging, sails, guns etc. were removed, and stored in the adjacent arsenal. Almost the whole the dock has now been filled up, and is occupied by modern buildings.

State ship yard in the French period

The events of 1795 created the Batavian Republic, the start of the French period in the Netherlands. The admiralties were replaced by a national committee for naval affairs. It meant that all assets of the admiralties were nationalized, leading to 5 state ship yards. In 1806 the Kingdom of Holland became the owner of the shipyard. In 1811 this kingdom was annexed by Napoleon's empire, making the yard an imperial French ship yard. This came to an end in late 1813, when the Netherlands became independent again. The French period was a disaster for Dutch shipping. It could have become a disaster for the yard, because of the construction of Willemsoord, a naval base near Den Helder, and a possible competitor.

The Rijkswerf

Ship yard in the United Kingdom of the Netherlands 
The founding of the United Kingdom of the Netherlands in 1815 meant a new start for 's Rijks Werf (national yard) Amsterdam. However, the context of 1815 was very different from that of 1795. The French time had been utterly ruinous for the Dutch economy. It caused that the nation could no longer afford a naval budget comparable to that of major European powers. Apart from that, the United Kingdom of the Netherlands was a state focusing on its place in a coalition that should keep France in check, and was therefore focused on its army. 

General circumstances were not conducive for much activity on the yard, but on a national scale the Rijkswerf Amsterdam was lucky. While Willemsoord remained as a naval base and was greatly expanded, the proponents of moving shipbuilding over there did not get their way. Most of the few new ships of the line and frigates that were built, were laid down in Amsterdam again, with Vlissingen and Rotterdam also having a share. In 1816 the remnants of the 'competing' navy yard in Harlingen were sold. In 1828 the Rijkswerf Medemblik was shut down.

A difficult start (1830-1850)
The united kingdom broke up in 1830. The final acts were the Ten Days' Campaign, the Siege of Antwerp (1832) and an English fleet blockading the Dutch coast, all ruinous for the state's finances. The secession of Belgium also stripped the coal and iron deposits from the Dutch state, a further disaster during the Industrial Revolution. It all led to rigorous economizing on the navy. The Rijkswerf Rotterdam would close in 1850. Meanwhile the Rijkswerf Amsterdam built a lot of small paddle steamers.

Screw Propulsion (1850-1860)
By the early 1850s the only Dutch state yards left were those in Vlissingen and Amsterdam. Meanwhile the Dutch state had found a new source of wealth in the Cultivation System implemented in the East Indies. It meant that more money became available for the navy, and investments went to these two establishments. This was just as well, because the invention of screw propulsion had just obsoleted the entire fleet of sail and paddle-steam ships that the Dutch had. The biggest screw ships that the Dutch needed, the steam frigates, were built in Vlissingen because of their draught. The Rijkswerf would built a large number of steam corvettes.

Facilities for armoring ships
When foreign powers started to armor their ships, the Dutch authorities decided to create facilities for armoring in Vlissingen, not in Amsterdam. This was a sound decision, because Vlissingen was the only Dutch harbor that had access to water deep enough to launch ships that could stand up to the biggest ships that foreign powers brought to bear.

In 1867 the Dutch government decided to move the armoring facilities to the Rijkswerf Amsterdam. This decision had to do with the overall defensive strategy that centered on only defending the places behind the Dutch Water Line.

Building armored ships
The first armored ships that the Rijkswerf Amsterdam constructed were copies of foreign ships that the Dutch navy had purchased. The Cerberus is a prime example. 

Later ships were built to Dutch designs. The yard built among others ironclads, protected cruisers, coastal defense ships, gunboats, monitors and unprotected cruisers.

The end of the Rijkswerf Amsterdam
In 1915 the Rijkswerf Amsterdam ceased to exist.

Ships built on the Rijkswerf

Notes

Shipyards of the Netherlands
Economy of Amsterdam
History of Amsterdam